JocJonJosch is an Anglo-Swiss visual arts collective based in London, Zürich and the Valais canton of Switzerland. The three members of JocJonJosch are Joschi Herczeg (b. 25/12/1975, Switzerland), Jonathan Brantschen (b. 30/09/1981, Switzerland) and Jocelyn Marchington (b. 29/06/1976, England).

Work
Their work finds its form in performance, sculpture, photography, video, drawing, painting and books, with a focus on issues of identity, specifically the ambiguity between the individual and the group.

Exhibitions
In 2009 their work appeared in the Royal Academy of Arts' summer exhibition in London.

JocJonJosh won the Manor Kunstpreis in 2013 which led to a solo exhibition in the Musée d'Art du Valais, Switzerland.

Their work eddy is included in the permanent collection of the Yorkshire Sculpture Park.

References

English artist groups and collectives
European artist groups and collectives
Valais